Telyn y Plant was a 19th-century Welsh language periodical. It was produced for Welsh speaking young people involved with the anti alcohol charity Band of Hope, now known as Hope UK, by Methodist minister Thomas Levi (1825-1916), and musician John Roberts (Ieuan Gwyllt, 1822-1877), in 1859. It contained mainly articles on subjects such as temperance, religion, and the activities of the Band of Hope, along with music and poetry.

References 

Periodicals published in Wales
Welsh-language magazines
Religious magazines published in the United Kingdom